Kochila Tharu, also called Septari or Saptariya Tharu, Madhya-Purbiya Tharu, and Mid-Eastern Tharu, is a diverse group of language varieties in the Tharu group of the Indo-Aryan languages.  The several names of the varieties refer to the regions where they dominate. It is one of the largest subgroupings of Tharu. It is spoken mainly in Nepal and India, with approximately 250,000 speakers as of 2003. In addition to language, cultural markers around attire and customs connect individuals into the ethnic identity Kochila.

Heavily concentrated in the eastern area of Terai, speakers of Kochila Tharu live in linguistically diverse regions and are generally multilingual (with the exception of some elderly female speakers). A 2013 survey by SIL International found that the language was being taught to children as their first language and used conversationally between multiple generations of speakers, characteristics of a "vigorous" language as defined by the Ethnologue Expanded Graded Intergenerational Disruption Scale (EGIDS).

References 

Eastern Indo-Aryan languages
Languages of Nepal
Languages of Sudurpashchim Province